The Four Squatters is a  mountain in British Columbia, Canada.

Description
The Four Squatters is located in the Purcell Mountains, southwest of Bugaboo Provincial Park, and southeast of the confluence of East Creek and Duncan River. Precipitation runoff from The Four Squatters drains into East and Howser creeks, which are both tributaries of the Duncan River. The nearest higher neighbor is line parent Howser Peak,  to the northeast.

History
The landform's name was applied in 1910 by Canadian surveyor Arthur Oliver Wheeler, and the mountain's toponym was officially adopted on June 9, 1960, by the Geographical Names Board of Canada. In the 1970s, guidebook author Robert Kruszyna applied unofficial names to the four separate highpoints: Aloof (3,069 m), Humble (3,002 m), Reposing (3,002 m), and Crouching (2,972 m).

Climate

Based on the Köppen climate classification, Four Squatters is located in a subarctic climate zone with cold, snowy winters, and mild summers. Winter temperatures can drop below −20 °C with wind chill factors below −30 °C. This climate supports an unnamed icefield surrounding the slopes of this remote massif.

See also
 The Bugaboos
 Geography of British Columbia

References

External links
 The Four Squatters: weather

Three-thousanders of British Columbia
Purcell Mountains
Kootenay Land District